Sunny Hindustani is an Indian singer and the winner of Indian Idol 11.

Early life and career
Sunny was born in Amarpura Basti, Bhatinda, Punjab, in a poor family. He was fond of music since his childhood and after dropping out of school, he started performing at various functions and events in his locality.

He appeared in the audition of Indian Idol Season 11 and got selected for the main show. Subsequently, in the final, getting the most audience votes, he became the winner of Season 11. During the show, he received a few offers from other music composers to playback for them in their upcoming films.

In 2019, he made his debut as a playback singer with the song "Rom Rom" for the film The Body. Veteran singer Amit Kumar also signed him for a song.

Discography

External links 
 www.sunnyhindustani.com

References

Living people
Indian Idol winners
Singers from Punjab, India
1998 births
Bollywood playback singers
21st-century Indian singers
People from Bathinda district
21st-century Indian male singers